The 1890 Championship of Australia was an Australian rules football match that took place on 4 October 1890.

The championship was contested by the premiers of the VFA, South Melbourne and the premiers of the SAFA, Port Adelaide.

The match was played at Adelaide Oval in Adelaide, South Australia.

The match, played in front of 6,500, was won by Port Adelaide by a margin of 1 goal, giving Port Adelaide its 1st Championship of Australia Title.

Match details

References 

Championship of Australia
Championship of Australia
October 1890 sports events